Hippocentrum is a genus of horse flies in the family Tabanidae.

Species
Hippocentrum concisum Speiser, 1914
Hippocentrum inappendiculatum (Bigot, 1858)
Hippocentrum murphyi Austen, 1912
Hippocentrum strigipenne (Karsch, 1889)
Hippocentrum versicolor Austen, 1908

References

Tabanidae
Brachycera genera
Diptera of Africa
Taxa named by Ernest Edward Austen